Andre "Dre" Deas (born November 7, 1997) is an American professional soccer player who plays as a forward for Flower City Union, in the National Independent Soccer Association.

Career

Youth, College and Amateur
Deas played one season with USSDA side Concorde Fire in 2014–2015, before playing college soccer at the University of Central Florida. After one season at UCF, Deas transferred to California State University, Northridge, where he played three more seasons, spending 2017 as a redshirted player. During his time with the Matadors, Deas made 51 appearances, scoring one goal and tallying two assists.

While in college, Deas was also part of the USL League Two side Ventura County Fusion, but never made a first team appearance for them.

Professional
On December 12, 2019, Deas signed his professional contract with USL Championship side Hartford Athletic. He made his debut on July 17, 2020, appearing as an 81st-minute substitute during a 1-0 win over New York Red Bulls II.

References

External links
UCF bio
Cal State Northridge bio
USL Championship bio

1997 births
American soccer players
Association football forwards
Cal State Northridge Matadors men's soccer players
Hartford Athletic players
Living people
Soccer players from Georgia (U.S. state)
UCF Knights men's soccer players
USL Championship players
Ventura County Fusion players
Flower City Union players
National Independent Soccer Association players
Sportspeople from Atlanta